Wolpyeong Station is a station of the Daejeon Metro Line 1 in Wolpyeong-dong, Seo District, Daejeon, South Korea. There are many apartment complexes and residential areas around Wolpyeong Station. On the north side of the station is Gapcheon Elementary School, and on the south side is Wolpyeong Middle School, Daejeon.

References

External links
  Wolpyeong  Station from Daejeon Metropolitan Express Transit Corporation

Daejeon Metro stations
Seo District, Daejeon
Railway stations opened in 2007